Rača is a village in the municipality of Ohrid, North Macedonia. It is located just southeast of the city of Ohrid.

Demographics
According to the 2002 census, the village had a total of 1043 inhabitants. Ethnic groups in the village include:

Macedonians 1040
Serbs 2
Others 1

References

Villages in Ohrid Municipality